Barnes Creek is a navigable stream located in the village of Pleasant Prairie in southeastern Kenosha County, Wisconsin, United States. It flows near Wisconsin Highway 165 and crosses beneath Wisconsin Highway 32 (Sheridan Road) which flows eastward through Carol Beach into Lake Michigan.

Barnes Creek Site

The Barnes Creek area is of high archaeological interest and is listed on the National Register of Historic Places as the location of prehistoric American Indian settlements dating to the mid-Woodland periods of 200 to 1400 AD.

References

External links
 Barnes Creek website

Rivers of Kenosha County, Wisconsin
Rivers of Wisconsin
Archaeological sites on the National Register of Historic Places in Wisconsin
Tributaries of Lake Michigan
National Register of Historic Places in Kenosha County, Wisconsin